Pakubuwono VII (also transliterated Pakubuwana VII) (28 July 1796 – 10 May 1858) was the seventh Susuhunan (ruler of Surakarta) from 1830 to 1858. He was a younger son of Pakubuwono IV.

References
Miksic, John N. (general ed.), et al. (2006)  Karaton Surakarta. A look into the court of Surakarta Hadiningrat, central Java (First published: 'By the will of His Serene Highness Paku Buwono XII'. Surakarta: Yayasan Pawiyatan Kabudayan Karaton Surakarta, 2004)  Marshall Cavendish Editions  Singapore  

Burials at Imogiri
Susuhunan of Surakarta
1796 births
1858 deaths
Indonesian royalty